Fomitopsis is a genus of more than 40 species of bracket fungi in the family Fomitopsidaceae.

Taxonomy
The genus was circumscribed by Finnish mycologist Petter Karsten in 1881 with Fomitopsis pinicola as the type species. Molecular analysis indicates that Fomitopsis belongs to the antrodia clade, which contains about 70 percent of brown-rot fungi. Other genera that join Fomitopsis in the core antrodia group include Amyloporia, Antrodia, Daedalea, Melanoporia, Piptoporus, and Rhodonia. Studies have indicated that Fomitopsis and Piptoporus were phylogenetically heterogenous, and the type of that genus, Piptoporus betulinus, is in the Fomitopsis core group. This fungus, well known for its use by Ötzi the Iceman, was transferred to Fomitopsis in 2016.

The whole genome sequence of Fomitopsis palustris was reported in 2017.

The generic name combines the name Fomes with the Ancient Greek word  ("appearance").

Description
Fomitopsis species have fruit bodies that are mostly perennial, with forms ranging from  sessile to effused-reflexed (partially crust-like and partially pileate). Fruit body texture is typically tough to woody, and the pore surface is white to tan or pinkish-colored with mostly small and regular pores. Microscopically, Fomitopsis has a dimitic hyphal system with clamped generative hyphae. The spores are hyaline, thin-walled, smooth, roughly spherical to cylindrical, and are negative in Melzer's reagent. Fomitopsis fungi cause a brown rot.

Species

More than 40 species have been accepted in Fomitopsis.

References

External links

 
Polyporales genera
Taxa named by Petter Adolf Karsten
Taxa described in 1881